Nikola Vujadinović (born 31 July 1986) is a Montenegrin footballer who plays as a central defender for Serbian club Čukarički.

Vujadinović also holds a Serbian and Bulgarian passport (and consequently EU citizenship) due to his grandfather being a Bulgarian. On international level, Vujadinović opted to play for Montenegrin national team.

Club career 
Vujadinović started his career at Red Star Belgrade. He later played for FK Rad, FK Zeta, and FK Radnički Pirot.

In May 2007, Vujadinović moved to CSKA Sofia on a free transfer, agreeing a three-year contract with the Bulgarian Premier League side. He appeared in 24 matches for the club, scoring once.

In August 2008, Udinese announced that they had secured the services of Vujadinović for a reported €1 million. He agreed a five-year contract with the Serie A club.

In September 2009, Vujadinović was loaned by Udinese to Unirea Alba Iulia of Romania. For the 2010–11 season, he was loaned to Scottish Premier League club Aberdeen. Mainly a replacement for Richard Foster, he had their initial application for a work permit rejected, which was later granted after an appeal.

On 15 January 2011, Vujadinović's loan was extended until the end of the season. Under managers Mark McGhee and then Craig Brown, he made 18 league appearances and also represented the club in the semi-finals of the Scottish Cup and the Scottish League Cup. His loan to Aberdeen expired at the end of the 2010–11 season following being photographed with avid fan Greg Davidson

During the winter break of the 2011–12 season, Vujadinović moved from Italy back to Serbia to play on loan with the SuperLiga side FK Javor Ivanjica.

On 24 June 2012, Vujadinović left Udinese and joined SK Sturm Graz on a two-year contract. He left the club in June 2014 despite appearing regularly.

On 31 October 2014, Vujadinović signed a one-year deal with CA Osasuna in Spanish Segunda División, mainly as a replacement to injured Jordan Lotiès.

On 16 July 2015, Vujadinović transferred to China League One side Beijing Enterprises Group.

On 7 July 2017 he signed a two-year contract with Polish club Lech Poznań. He debuted on 27 July 2017 during the UEFA Europa League away game against Utrecht.

On 11 October 2019, Slovenian side NK Domžale announced that they signed with Vujadinović until the end of the 2019–20 season.

On 2 August 2020, Vujadinović signed a one-year contract with Sabah FK.

Career statistics

1All appearances in Scottish League Cup.

Honours
CSKA Sofia
Bulgarian League: 2007–08

References

External links
 
 
 
 
 

1986 births
Living people
Footballers from Belgrade
Montenegrin people of Bulgarian descent
Serbian people of Montenegrin descent
Serbian people of Bulgarian descent
Association football defenders
Serbia and Montenegro footballers
Serbian footballers
Montenegrin footballers
Montenegro under-21 international footballers
FK Rad players
FK Zeta players
FK Radnički Pirot players
PFC CSKA Sofia players
Udinese Calcio players
CSM Unirea Alba Iulia players
Aberdeen F.C. players
FK Javor Ivanjica players
SK Sturm Graz players
CA Osasuna players
Beijing Sport University F.C. players
Lech Poznań players
NK Domžale players
Sabah FC (Azerbaijan) players
FK Radnički Niš players
FK Čukarički players
First League of Serbia and Montenegro players
Serbian SuperLiga players
First Professional Football League (Bulgaria) players
Liga I players
Scottish Premier League players
Austrian Football Bundesliga players
Segunda División players
China League One players
La Liga players
Ekstraklasa players
Slovenian PrvaLiga players
Azerbaijan Premier League players
Montenegrin expatriate footballers
Expatriate footballers in Bulgaria
Expatriate footballers in Italy
Expatriate footballers in Romania
Expatriate footballers in Scotland
Expatriate footballers in Austria
Expatriate footballers in Spain
Expatriate footballers in China
Expatriate footballers in Poland
Expatriate footballers in Slovenia
Expatriate footballers in Azerbaijan
Montenegrin expatriate sportspeople in Bulgaria
Montenegrin expatriate sportspeople in Italy
Montenegrin expatriate sportspeople in Romania
Montenegrin expatriate sportspeople in Scotland
Montenegrin expatriate sportspeople in Austria
Montenegrin expatriate sportspeople in Spain
Montenegrin expatriate sportspeople in Poland
Montenegrin expatriate sportspeople in Slovenia
Montenegrin expatriate sportspeople in Azerbaijan